Dungarpur district
Villages in Dungarpur district
Saroda is a village in Sagwara Tehsil in Dungarpur District in Rajasthan, India. It is situated 18km away from sub-district headquarter Sagwara and 63km away from district headquarter Dungarpur. As per 2009 stats, Saroda village is also a gram panchayat.

The total geographical area of village is 910 hectares. Saroda has a total population of 4,076 peoples. There are about 856 houses in Saroda village. Sagwara is nearest town to Saroda which is approximately 18km away.